Vasyl Mykhailovych Bertash (born 7 January 1961, in Rokytne, Ukraine) is a Ukrainian construction engineer and later politician, member of the Verkhovna Rada.

Early Years 
In 1979-1980 he worked for various Soviet agrarian firms (collective or state farms) in Dubno and Lutsk raions as a construction laborer.

After graduating from the University of Water and Nature Management in Rivne, in 1985-1992, Bertash worked as a construction engineer and general contractor.

From 1992-1998 he is CEO of polish-Ukrainian company REMROL.

Officer career 
From 1998-2005 he worked at the Rivne Oblast State Administration, heading regional construction department.

He was deputy of the Oblast Council in 2002-2006.

Political career 
From 2006-2007 Bertash was a member of the Verkhovna Rada representing the Party of Regions.

From 2010-2014 he served as a Governor of Rivne Oblast.

In 2023, he was a deputy of the Rivne Oblast Council.

Awards 
 Honored Builder of Ukraine (December 2000).
 Order of Merit of the 3rd degree (April 2002), 2nd degree (January 2011), 1st degree (January 2013); for a significant personal contribution to state building, socio-economic development of the Rivne region, many years of conscientious work and high professionalism.
 International Order of the Smile (2003).
 Certificate of Honor of the Cabinet of Ministers of Ukraine (April 2004).
 Doctor of philosophy in the field of public administration.

Hobbies 
Vasyl Bertash is the president of the Rivne public organization "Billiards Sports Association".

Other hobbies: sports, hunting, fishing.

Family 
He is married. Son Myroslav was born in 1981.

References

External links
 Profile at the Official Ukraine Today portal

1961 births
Living people
People from Rivne Oblast
Governors of Rivne Oblast
Fifth convocation members of the Verkhovna Rada
Party of Regions politicians
Recipients of the Honorary Diploma of the Cabinet of Ministers of Ukraine